Werner Walzer (born 23 August 1947) is an Austrian retired footballer.

References

External links
 Rapid Archiv
 Sturm Archiv

1947 births
Living people
Austrian footballers
Austria international footballers
Association football midfielders
Austrian Football Bundesliga players
SK Rapid Wien players
Wiener Sport-Club players
1. Wiener Neustädter SC players